Steve or Steven Barker may refer to:

 Steve Barker (film director), (born 1971), English film director and screenwriter
 Steve Barker (soccer), (born 1967), South African footballer 

 Steven Barker, British man charged in the Death of Baby P

See also
 Stephen Barker (disambiguation)
 Steve Baker (disambiguation)